Mats Nordlander (born 25 November 1963) is a Swedish archer. He competed in the men's individual and team events at the 1988 Summer Olympics.

References

External links
 

1963 births
Living people
Swedish male archers
Olympic archers of Sweden
Archers at the 1988 Summer Olympics
People from Sundsvall
Sportspeople from Västernorrland County
20th-century Swedish people